Bo Henning Gustafsson (born 29 September 1954) is a former Swedish athlete who mainly competed in the men's 50 kilometre walk during his career.

Biography
He competed for Sweden at the 1984 Summer Olympics held in Los Angeles, California, where he won the silver medal in the men's 50 kilometre walk event. Gustafsson was a Latter-day Saint.  He was a convert to the Church of Jesus Christ of Latter-day Saints who had joined before he competed in the Olympics.

Personal life
Gustafsson was born in Strömstad, Sweden to Henning and Klara Gustafsson. He was married to Lis Herrey and they had four sons and one daughter together. Son Andreas Gustafsson, who Bo coaches, is also a Swedish Olympic racewalker, later changing allegiance to USA.

From 1996 he is the companion of the Italian racewalker, several times medal at World Athletics Championships and European Athletics Championships, Ileana Salvador. The couple has two daughters, Nicole (born 1995) and Noelle (born 1998) who is a model and in 2019 she participated in the selections for the Miss Italia contest.

Business career
Bo Gustafsson is currently the owner of Restaurang Storseglet based in Gothenburg, Sweden. He previously founded several companies and has been the manager of many artists, including the Herreys.

Achievements

References

External links
 

1954 births
Living people
People from Strömstad Municipality
Swedish male racewalkers
Converts to Mormonism
Swedish Latter Day Saints
Olympic silver medalists for Sweden
Athletes (track and field) at the 1980 Summer Olympics
Athletes (track and field) at the 1984 Summer Olympics
Athletes (track and field) at the 1988 Summer Olympics
Olympic athletes of Sweden
European Athletics Championships medalists
Olympic silver medalists in athletics (track and field)
Medalists at the 1984 Summer Olympics
Sportspeople from Västra Götaland County